Lars Hinneburg (born 15 June 1965 in Rostock, Mecklenburg-Vorpommern) is a former freestyle swimmer from East Germany, who competed for his native country at the 1988 Summer Olympics in Seoul, South Korea. There he won the bronze medal in the men's 4×100 m freestyle relay, together with Steffen Zesner, Thomas Flemming, and Dirk Richter.

References
 
 

1965 births
Living people
German male swimmers
Olympic swimmers of East Germany
Olympic bronze medalists for East Germany
Swimmers at the 1988 Summer Olympics
Sportspeople from Rostock
Olympic bronze medalists in swimming
German male freestyle swimmers
World Aquatics Championships medalists in swimming
European Aquatics Championships medalists in swimming
Medalists at the 1988 Summer Olympics